Adolf Müller may refer to:

Adolf Müller (footballer)
 Adolf Müller (wrestler) (1914–2005), Swiss wrestler
 Adolf Müller (industrialist) (1857–1932), Croatian industrialist
 Adolf Müller (engineer) (fl. 1936–1944), German jet engine designer who worked for Junkers and Heinkel-Hirth
 Adolf Muller (politician) (fl. 1935–1969), Australian politician from Queensland
 Adolf Müller senior (1801–1886), Austrian composer
 Adolf Müller Jr. (fl. 1899), compiler of the Johann Strauss II operetta Wiener Blut

See also
 Adolf Müllner (1774-1829), German critic and dramatic poet